The future Line 3 is planned to be a semi-circular subway line of Incheon. With 66.73km of route extension, it was scheduled to win the title of the longest circular line in the world.
When the initial plan was presented, the project was stranded due to lack of economic feasibility, but it is pushing ahead with its pledge to re-promote the project as a new mayor takes office.

See also
 Incheon Subway
 Seoul Subway
 Transportation in South Korea
 Incheon

References

External links
Incheon Subway at UrbanRail.net

Seoul Metropolitan Subway lines
Incheon Subway
Proposed public transport in South Korea